The Senate ( / ) is the upper chamber of the bicameral Parliament of Madagascar. The Senate has 33 members: 22 are indirectly elected, one from each of the 22 regions of Madagascar, and 11 are appointed by the President. 

The Senate existed under the First Republic (1958–1975) and was a weaker body than the National Assembly, the lower house of Parliament. Only the National Assembly could vote on a motion of censure against the government. Two-thirds of the First Republic Senators were elected by provincial and municipal bodies, serving six-year terms (with half of the seats up for election every three years), while the other one-third were appointed by the government.

Under the Second Republic (1975–1993), the Senate was abolished, leaving the National Assembly as a unicameral parliament. Under the Third Republic (1993–present), the Senate was restored, with two-thirds of the Senators being indirectly elected and the other one-third being appointed by the President. As was the case during the First Republic, it cannot vote to censure the government, but it also cannot be dissolved.

Prior to the Senate election held on April 20, 2008, at which time the reduction to 33 members took effect, the Senate had 90 members. Sixty Senators, 10 for each province, were elected by provincial electors, while the other thirty Senators were appointed by the President.

In the April 2008 Senate election, the ruling Tiako i Madagasikara (TIM) party won all 22 of the elected seats. The President of TIM, Yvan Randriasandratriniony, was elected as President of the Senate on May 6, 2008; previously, Rajemison Rakotomaharo was President of the Senate from 2002 to 2008. The President of the Senate is the legal successor to the President of the Republic in the event of a vacancy in the latter position.

In March 2009 interim-president Andry Rajoelina dissolved both Houses of Parliament.

On 29 December 2015 elections were held for the Senate, 42 senators were elected by mayors and councillors. These were the first elections since the dissolving of the Senate in 2009. On 1 February 2016 the remaining 21 senators were appointed by Madagascar President Hery Rajaonarimampianina.

Current members
Yvan Randriasandratriniony
Rémy Vincent Andrianjanaka
Charles Sylvain Rabotoarison
Jules Androkae
Charlie Rakotoariventiny
Manasé Bezara
Noël Rakotondramboa
Jeanne Razafiangy Dina Fotomanantena
Raymond Ramandimbilahatra
Guy Arvely Dolsin
Emiline Rakotobe
Jeannot Fernand
Jean Chrysostome Randimbisoa
Jean de la Croix Ipirina
Jean Baptiste Randriamaro
Alfred Josoa
Roland Ravatomanga
Jean Parfait Laurent Mafilaza
Edouard Robert
Tahiry Mosa
René Razafiarison
Eliane Rosa Naika
Christophe Samuel
Johanita Ndahimananjara
Jean André Soja
Gilbert Evenom Ngolo
Berthin Telolahy
Lantoniaina Rabenatoandro
Horace Mann Thu-Jaune
Benjamin Rabenorolahy
Jacky Mahafaly Tsiandopy
Tovonanahary Rabetsitonta
Ruffine Tsiranana

See also
List of presidents of the Senate of Madagascar

References

External links
Official site

Madagascar
Government of Madagascar
1958 establishments in Madagascar